The Corrs have won 24 awards out 48 nominations over their career. Their awards are predominantly in pop and Rock genre categories. There have been many controversial categories the band have been nominated in including Billboard awards' Jazz Act, considering the band are not Jazz, or nominated as a female group considering the band consist of male and females.

APRA Music Awards 
The APRA Music Awards are several award ceremonies run in Australia by Australian Performing Right Association to recognise songwriting skills, sales and airplay performance by its members annually. The Corrs were nominated along with Robert "Mutt" Lange for  Most Performed Foreign Work with Breathless.

Big Buzz Awards

Big Buzz Awards

Pepsi Award

Billboard Music Video Awards 

The Billboard Music Awards is sponsored by Billboard Magazine and is held annually in December. The Billboard Year-End Charts Awards are based on sales data by Nielsen SoundScan and radio information by Nielsen Broadcast Data Systems.

BMI Awards

BMI London Award

BRIT Awards 

The BRIT Awards are the British Phonographic Industry's annual pop music awards

Capital FM's London Awards

CARA Awards

ECHO Awards 

The ECHO Awards are a German music award show created in 1992. Each year's winner is determined by the previous year's sales.

Grammy Awards 

The Grammy Awards are held annually by the National Academy of Recording Arts and Sciences.

Heineken Hot Press Rock Awards

HMV Awards

Hot Press Irish Music Awards

Irish National Entertainment Awards

Irish World Awards

IRMA Music Awards

Ivor Novello Awards

M6 Awards

Meteor Ireland Music Awards 

A Meteor Ireland Music Award is an accolade bestowed upon professionals in the music industry in Ireland and further afield. Apart from 2011, they have been bestowed each year since 2001, replacing the IRMA Ireland Music Awards held in the 1990s.

My VH1 Music Awards 

The My VH1 Music Awards was an annual music award ceremony held by American television network VH1 held in both 2000 and 2001. Categories, nominees, and winners were selected entirely by public voting at VH1.com.

Nokia TMF Awards

NRJ Music Awards 

An NRJ Music Award (commonly abbreviated as an NMA) is an award presented by the French radio station NRJ to honor the best in the French and worldwide music industry.

Amigo Awards

Ondas Awards 

!Ref.
|-
| 2004
| The Corrs
| Special Jury Award
| 
|

Q Awards

Singapore Radio Music Awards

Smash Hits Poll Winners Party  
{| class="wikitable"
|-
!Year
!Recipient
!Award
!Result
!Ref.
|-
| 2000
| The Corrs
| Best Non-British Band
| 
|

TMF Awards

World Music Awards 

The World Music Awards is an international awards show founded in 1989 that annually honors recording artists based on worldwide sales figures provided by the International Federation of the Phonographic Industry (IFPI).

References 

Awards
Lists of awards received by Irish musician
Lists of awards received by musical group